The Renault 4Ever Trophy is a planned battery electric vehicle manufactured by Renault that will be sold starting in 2025. It is a crossover utility vehicle based on the same CMF-B EV platform as the Renault 5 EV and takes its name and inspiration from the Renault 4 hatchback that was produced from 1961 to 1994. The prototype was revealed as a concept during the 2022 Paris Motor Show on 17 October 2022.

History
In 2021, the Renault 4ever was announced as one of several new EVs Renault would introduce by 2025. "4Ever" is the name of the EV project that resulted in the 4Ever Trophy prototype concept car first shown at the Paris Motor Show in October 2022; the final name has not been selected yet. The planned 4Ever is a compact crossover cousin of the forthcoming all-electric Renault 5 EV. Both the 4Ever and 5 EV are based on the same CMF-B EV platform; because the CMF-B EV platform shares  of its components with the existing CMF-B platform, production costs are expected to be  of the current B-segment EV offered by Renault, the Zoe. The 4ever is expected to sell at a premium compared to the 5 EV; the relationship between the 5 EV and 4Ever is expected to be analogous to the relationship between the CMF-B based Clio and Captur.

A commercial panel van variant also is planned which will share the front end and front compartment of the 4Ever with an enlarged cargo area, similar to the relationship between the R4 Fourgonnette and the original Renault 4.

The 4Ever will be built alongside the 5 EV at Renault ElectriCity, a planned union of three existing Renault factories in northern France, Douai, Maubeuge, and Ruitz; ElectriCity is scheduled to produce 400,000 EVs per year by 2025. Both the SUV and van variant of the 4Ever will be assembled at Maubeuge, while 5 EV will be assembled at Douai; because the CMF-B EV cousin Nissan Micra EV also will be assembled at Douai, production of the 4Ever SUV was shifted to Maubeuge. In addition, Renault plans to build a new battery factory in Douai as a joint venture with Envision AESC.

Earlier use of "4ever" and electromod
In 2011, Renault sponsored the "Renault 4ever" contest that "aim[ed] to revive the R4's spirit" and celebrated the original R4's 50th anniversary. The contest was held conjunction with the web magazine designboom. The competition was won by Mark Cunningham, who received a vintage R4 rally car.

In 2019, a vintage R4 Plein Air convertible was restored and shown at the 10th annual Renault 4L International Festival in 2019.

Overview

Concept

Some teaser photos were released on October 4th, ahead of the official debut on October 17th. The production version is expected to carry smaller wheels and delete the fender flares.

Specifications
The center section of CMF-B EV is modified from the conventional CMF-B to accommodate a flat, underfloor battery. Powertrain details of the 2022 Trophy concept confirmed the power output and battery capacity (42 kW-hr), but the range was not rated as it was not a drivable prototype.

References

External links

Renault
Renault concept vehicles